Kamyshovo is a rural locality (a selo) and the administrative center of Kamyshovsky Selsoviet, Limansky District, Astrakhan Oblast, Russia. The population was 654 as of 2010. There are 4 streets.

Geography 
Kamyshovo is located 35 km northeast of Liman (the district's administrative centre) by road. Yar-Bazar is the nearest rural locality.

References 

Rural localities in Limansky District